Jacksonville station is an Amtrak train station in Jacksonville, Florida, United States. It serves the Silver Meteor and Silver Star trains as well as Amtrak Thruway buses to Lakeland. The station is located at 3570 Clifford Ln, Jacksonville, FL.

History
Amtrak's Northside station was opened on January 4, 1974, replacing Jacksonville Union Terminal downtown. "Jacksonville Terminal" as it is sometimes called, is now the Prime F. Osborn III Convention Center. The Northside station saw 8 trains daily upon opening, 4 in each direction. Those trains were the Silver Meteor, Silver Star, Champion, and Floridian, but also very briefly saw the Vacationer. The Floridian and Champion would later be discontinued in the 1979 budget cuts.

In 1993, the Sunset Limited was extended east from its New Orleans terminus all the way to Miami, and added a stop at Jacksonville. Then in 1996, the station's services were further expanded to include the newly reinstated Silver Palm running from New York to Tampa.

On November 1, 2004 however, the Silver Palm, now renamed to Palmetto, had its terminus cut back to Savannah, Georgia. Later in 2005, the Sunset Limited was suspended east of New Orleans in the wake of Hurricane Katrina, and still has yet to be reinstated. This has left the station with just two trains in each direction a day: the Silver Meteor and Silver Star.

Gallery

Future
In March 2021, Amtrak announced the "Connect 2035", or "Connects Us" program, aimed at adding new Amtrak services around the country. Jacksonville was not left out of this plan, and two daily round trips between Jacksonville and Tampa via Orlando have been proposed. The service is projected to generate a combined $338 million in annual economic impact in the region and nearly $3.5 billion in economic activity from one-time capital investments.

In June 2021, Senator Jon Tester (D-Montana) added an amendment to the Surface Transportation Investment Act of 2021 which requires the Department of Transportation (not Amtrak itself) to evaluate the restoration of discontinued long-distance routes, such as the Champion and Floridian. The bill passed the Senate Commerce Committee with bipartisan support, and was later rolled into President Biden's Infrastructure Investment and Jobs Act, which was passed into law in November 2021. The report must be delivered to Congress within two years. The law also provides $2.4 billion in new funds to Amtrak's long-distance route network. Currently though, there are no plans to restore trains such as the Champion and Floridian, but that could change in the future, depending on if there is support for such services.

References

External links

Jacksonville Amtrak Station, with Former Jacksonville Union Terminal (USA Rail Guide - TrainWeb)

Amtrak stations in Florida
Buildings and structures in Jacksonville, Florida
Transportation in Jacksonville, Florida
Amtrak Thruway Motorcoach stations in Florida
Northside, Jacksonville
Transportation buildings and structures in Duval County, Florida
1974 establishments in Florida
Railway stations in the United States opened in 1974